Marion County Schools is a school district in Marion County, Alabama, headquartered in Hamilton.

Schools

High Schools
 Brilliant School (7-12 Campus)
 Hackleburg High School
 Hamilton High School
 Marion County High School
 Phillips High School

Middle Schools
 Brilliant School (7-12 Campus)
 Hamilton Middle School

Elementary Schools
 Brilliant School (K-6 Campus)
 Guin Elementary School
 Hackleburg Elementary School
 Hamilton Elementary School
 Phillips Elementary School

References

External links
 

Education in Marion County, Alabama